Chihine     is a municipality in Southern Lebanon, located in Tyre District, Governorate of South Lebanon.

Name
According to E. H. Palmer, the name comes from a personal name.

History
In 1875 Victor Guérin found here 200 Metawileh inhabitants.  He also noted: "that the hill on which the village stands is surrounded by an enclosure constructed of great blocks regularly cut and of varying dimensions. Here and there are standing, unbroken, pieces of this thick wall. On the highest point of the hill may be remarked the remains of a fortress built with stones of the same dressing, the interior of which has been transformed into private houses, themselves half demolished. Near here the site of an ancient tower is still to be made out. Here are also broken sarcophagi, cisterns, a press cut in the rock, and a great basin to hold rain-water."

In 1881, the PEF's Survey of Western Palestine (SWP) described it:  "A stone and mud village, containing  150  Metawileh, with traces of ruins [..], situated on ridge of hills, with figs, olives and arable land. Here is a large birket and twelve cisterns for water."  

They further noted: "Some large well-dressed stones and foundations of  ancient buildings ; one column and broken sculptured stone ; probably an ancient place of importance."

During Operation Accountability, July 1993, Chihine was one of the villages devastated by Israeli artillery. On 19 August, nineteen days after the cease fire was established, eight Israeli soldiers were killed in a Hizbollah ambush close to the village.

References

Bibliography

External links
 Chihine, Localiban
Survey of Western Palestine, Map 3:  IAA, Wikimedia commons

Populated places in the Israeli security zone 1985–2000
Populated places in Tyre District
Shia Muslim communities in Lebanon